Zé Luís (born 1991), born José Luís Mendes Andrade, is a Cape Verdean football striker.

Zé Luís is a nickname for various people with the given name José Luís and may also refer to:

Zé Luis (footballer, born 1971), born José Luis Boscolo, Brazilian football forward
Zé Luís (footballer, born 1979), born José Luís Santos da Visitação, Brazilian football defensive midfielder
Zé Luís (footballer, born 1989), born Luis de Sousa Pereira Vaz, Mozambican football midfielder

See also
Zé Luiz (disambiguation)
Zé Luis Oliveira (born 1957), born José Luis Segneri Oliveira, Brazilian musician
Zé Luís Araque (born 1975), born José Luís Alpalhão Regada Prazeres, Portuguese football midfielder